This is a list of named alloys grouped alphabetically by base metal. Within these headings, the alloys are also grouped alphabetically. Some of the main alloying elements are optionally listed after the alloy names.

Alloys by base metal

Aluminium

 AA-8000: used for electrical building wire in the U.S. per the National Electrical Code, replacing AA-1350.
 Al–Li (2.45% lithium): aerospace applications, including the Space Shuttle
 Alnico (nickel, cobalt): used for permanent magnets
 Aluminium–Scandium (scandium)
 Birmabright (magnesium, manganese): used in car bodies, mainly used by Land Rover cars.
 Duralumin (copper)
 Hiduminium or R.R. alloys (2% copper, iron, nickel): used in aircraft pistons
 Hydronalium (up to 12% magnesium, 1% manganese): used in shipbuilding, resists seawater corrosion 
 Italma (3.5% magnesium, 0.3% manganese): formerly used to make coinage of the Italian lira
 Magnalium (5-50% magnesium): used in airplane bodies, ladders, pyrotechnics, etc.
 Ni-Ti-Al (Titanium 40%, Aluminum 10%), also called Nital
 Y alloy (4% copper, nickel, magnesium)
Aluminium also forms complex metallic alloys, like β–Al–Mg, ξ'–Al–Pd–Mn, and T–Al3Mn.

Beryllium

 Lockalloy (62% Beryllium, 38% Aluminium)

Bismuth

 Bismanol (manganese); magnetic alloy from the 1950s using powder metallurgy
 Cerrosafe (lead, tin, cadmium)
 Rose metal (lead, tin)
 Wood's metal (lead, tin, cadmium)

Chromium

 Chromium hydride (hydrogen)
 Nichrome (nickel)
 Ferrochrome (iron)
 CrNi60WTi, a stainless steel alloy of chromium, nickel, 60 percent tungsten and titanium formed under electro-slag remelting (ESR) or vacuum arc remelting (VAR) conditions

Cobalt

 Elgiloy (cobalt, chromium, nickel, iron, molybdenum, manganese, carbon) 
 Megallium (cobalt, chromium, molybdenum)
 Stellite (chromium, tungsten, carbon)
 Talonite (tungsten, molybdenum, carbon)
 Ultimet (chromium, nickel, iron, molybdenum, tungsten) 
 Vitallium (cobalt, chromium, molybdenum)

Copper

 Arsenical copper (arsenic)
 Beryllium copper (0.5-3% Beryllium, 99.5%-97% Copper)  (beryllium)
 Billon (silver)
 Brass (zinc) see also Brass §Brass types for longer list
 Calamine brass (zinc)
 Chinese silver (zinc)
 Dutch metal (zinc)
 Gilding metal (zinc)
 Muntz metal (zinc)
 Pinchbeck (zinc)
 Prince's metal (zinc)
 Tombac (zinc)
 Bronze (tin, aluminium or other element)
 Aluminium bronze (aluminium)
 Arsenical bronze (arsenic, tin)
 Bell metal (tin)
 Florentine bronze (aluminium or tin)
 Glucydur (beryllium, iron)
 Guanín (gold silver)
 Gunmetal (tin, zinc)
 Phosphor bronze (tin and phosphorus)
 Ormolu (zinc)
 Silicon bronze (tin, arsenic, silicon)
 Speculum metal (tin)
 White bronze (tin, zinc)
 Constantan (nickel)
 Copper hydride (hydrogen)
 Copper–tungsten (tungsten)
 Corinthian bronze (gold, silver)
 Cunife (nickel, iron)
 Cupronickel (nickel)
 CuAg (silver)
 Cymbal alloys (tin)
 Devarda's alloy (aluminium, zinc)
 Hepatizon (gold, silver)
 Manganin (manganese, nickel)
 Melchior (nickel); high corrosion resistance, used in marine applications in condenser tubes 
 Nickel silver (nickel)
 Nordic gold (aluminium, zinc, tin)
 Shakudo (gold)
 Tumbaga (gold)

Gallium

 Al Ga (aluminium, gallium)
 Galfenol (iron)
Galinstan (indium, tin)

Gold

See also notes below
 Colored gold (silver, copper)
 Crown gold (silver, copper)
 Electrum (silver)
 Rhodite (rhodium)
 Rose gold (copper)
 Tumbaga (copper)
 White gold (nickel, palladium)

Indium

 Field's metal (bismuth, tin)

Iron

Most iron alloys are steels, with carbon as a major alloying element.

 Elinvar (nickel, chromium)
 Fernico (nickel, cobalt)
 Ferroalloys (:Category:Ferroalloys)
 Ferroboron
 Ferrocerium
 Ferrochrome
 Ferromagnesium
 Ferromanganese
 Ferromolybdenum
 Ferronickel
 Ferrophosphorus
 Ferrosilicon
 Ferrotitanium
 Ferrouranium
 Ferrovanadium
 Invar (nickel)
 Cast iron (carbon)
 Pig iron (carbon)
 Iron hydride (hydrogen)
 Kanthal (20–30% chromium, 4–7.5% aluminium); used in heating elements, including e-cigarettes
 Kovar (nickel, cobalt)
 Spiegeleisen (manganese, carbon, silicon)
 Staballoy (stainless steel) (manganese, chromium, carbon) - see also Uranium below 
 Steel (carbon) (:Category:Steels)
 Bulat steel
 Chromoly (chromium, molybdenum)
 Crucible steel
 Damascus steel
 Ducol
 Hadfield steel
 High-speed steel
 Mushet steel
 HSLA steel
 Maraging steel
 Reynolds 531
 Silicon steel (silicon)
 Spring steel
 Stainless steel (chromium, nickel)
 AL-6XN
 Alloy 20
 Celestrium
 Marine grade stainless
 Martensitic stainless steel
 Alloy 28 or Sanicro 28 (nickel, chromium)
 Surgical stainless steel (chromium, molybdenum, nickel)
 Zeron 100 (chromium, nickel, molybdenum)
 Tool steel (tungsten or manganese)
 Silver steel (US:Drill rod) (manganese, chromium, silicon)
 Weathering steel ('Cor-ten') (silicon, manganese, chromium, copper, vanadium, nickel)
 Wootz steel

Lead

 Molybdochalkos (copper)
 Solder (tin)
 Terne (tin)
 Type metal (tin, antimony)

Magnesium

 Elektron
 Magnox (0.8% aluminium, 0.004% beryllium); used in nuclear reactors
 T-Mg–Al–Zn (Bergman phase) is a complex metallic alloy

Manganese
 MN40, used in a foil for brazing
 MN70, used in a foil for brazing

Mercury

 Amalgam
 Ashtadhatu

Nickel

 :Category: Nickel alloys
 Alnico (aluminium, cobalt); used in magnets
 Alumel (manganese, aluminium, silicon)
 Brightray (20% chromium, iron, rare earths); originally for hard-facing valve seats 
 Chromel (chromium)
 Cupronickel (bronze, copper)
 Ferronickel (iron)
 German silver (copper, zinc)
 Hastelloy (molybdenum, chromium, sometimes tungsten)
 Inconel (chromium, iron)
 Inconel 686 (chromium, molybdenum, tungsten)
 Monel metal (copper, iron, manganese)
 Nichrome (chromium)
 Nickel-carbon (carbon)
 Nicrosil (chromium, silicon, magnesium)
 Nimonic (chromium, cobalt, titanium), used in jet engine turbine blades
 Nisil (silicon)
 Nitinol (titanium, shape memory alloy)
 Magnetically "soft" alloys
 Mu-metal (iron)
 Permalloy (iron, molybdenum)
 Supermalloy (molybdenum)
 Brass (copper, zinc, manganese)
 Nickel hydride (hydrogen)
 Stainless steel (chromium, molybdenum, carbon, manganese, sulphur, phosphorus, silicon)
Coin silver (nickel)

Plutonium

 Plutonium–aluminium
 Plutonium–cerium
 Plutonium–cerium–cobalt
 Plutonium–gallium (gallium)
 Plutonium–gallium–cobalt
 Plutonium–zirconium

Potassium

 NaK (sodium)
 KLi (lithium)

Rare earths

 Mischmetal (various rare earth elements)
 Terfenol-D (terbium, dysprosium, and iron), a highly magnetostrictive alloy used in portable speakers such as the SoundBug device
 Ferrocerium (cerium, iron)
 Neodymium magnets, another strong permanent magnet
 SmCo (cobalt); used for permanent magnets in guitar pickups, headphones, satellite transponders, etc.
 Scandium hydride (hydrogen)
 Lanthanum-nickel alloy (nickel)

Rhodium
 Pseudo palladium (rhodium–silver alloy)

Silver

 Argentium sterling silver (copper, germanium)
 Billon
 Britannia silver (copper)
 Doré bullion (gold)
 Dymalloy (copper, metal matrix composite with diamond)
 Electrum (gold)
 Goloid (copper, gold)
 Platinum sterling (platinum)
 Shibuichi (copper)
 Sterling silver (copper)
 Tibetan silver (copper)

Sodium
 NaK (potassium)

Titanium

 6al–4v (aluminium, vanadium)
 Beta C (vanadium, chromium, others)
 Gum metal (niobium, tantalum, zirconium, oxygen); used in spectacle frames, precision screws, etc.  
 Titanium hydride (hydrogen)
 Titanium nitride (nitrogen)
 Titanium gold (gold)

Tin

 Babbitt (copper, antimony, lead; used for bearing surfaces)
 Britannium (copper, antimony)
 Pewter (antimony, copper)
 Queen's metal (antimony, lead, and bismuth)
 Solder (lead, antimony)
 Terne (lead)
 White metal, (copper or lead); used as base metal for plating, in bearings, etc.

Uranium

 Staballoy (depleted uranium with other metals, usually titanium or molybdenum). See also Iron above for Staballoy (stainless steel). 
 Uranium hydride (hydrogen)

Zinc

 Zamak (aluminium, magnesium, copper)
 Electroplated zinc alloys

See also
 Complex metallic alloys
 Heusler alloy, a range of ferromagnetic alloys (66% copper, cobalt, iron, manganese, nickel or palladium)
 High-entropy alloys
 Intermetallic compounds
 List of brazing alloys
 Pot metal; inexpensive casting metal of non-specific composition

Notes

References 

Alloys